Parliamentary elections were held in Slovakia on 14 June 1964, alongside national elections. All 92 seats in the National Council were won by the National Front.

Results

References

Slovak
Parliamentary elections in Slovakia
Legislative elections in Czechoslovakia
One-party elections
Slovak
Election and referendum articles with incomplete results